

Ireland (and predecessor states)
The executive branch of the modern state of Ireland is titled the Government of Ireland. It has had this title since the adoption of the Constitution of Ireland in 1937. The Ministry of Dáil Éireann was the cabinet of the Irish Republic, from operated from 1919 to 1922. This overlapped with the Provisional Government which was put in place after the approval of the Anglo-Irish Treaty in January 1922. Both these cabinets ceased to operate from December 1922, on the coming into being of the Irish Free State. From 1922 to 1937, the cabinet was known as the Executive Council of the Irish Free State.

Types of government since 1919

Cabinets since 1919

Footnotes

Northern Ireland

The current devolved branch of Northern Ireland is known as the Northern Ireland Executive, established under the Good Friday Agreement. The Executive has been in operation, intermittently, since 1999, and is current operational. Since 1921, Northern Ireland has been governed by two other devolved cabinets: Executive Committee of the Privy Council from 1921 to 1972 and the Northern Ireland Executive of 1974. Northern Ireland has also been governed by direct rule from 1972 to 1974, 1974–98 and 2002–07.

Types of government since 1921

Direct rule
The Northern Ireland Office under the Secretary of State for Northern Ireland, established initially by the Northern Ireland (Temporary Provisions) Act 1972 and later Northern Ireland Constitution Act 1973.

Cabinets since 1921

Footnotes

See also
Irish heads of government since 1919
Dáil election results
Dáil vote for Taoiseach
Elections in the Republic of Ireland
History of the Republic of Ireland
Politics of the Republic of Ireland
Elections in Northern Ireland
Politics of Northern Ireland
Northern Ireland Assembly
Parliament of Northern Ireland

References

External links
Government of Ireland – History of Government

Political history of Ireland